Yusif Imanov (born on 27 September 2002) is an Azerbaijani professional footballer who plays as a goalkeeper for Sabah in the Azerbaijan Premier League.

Career

Club
On 19 March 2022, Imanov made his debut in the Azerbaijan Premier League for Sabah match against Sabail.

References

External links
 

2002 births
Living people
Association football goalkeepers
Azerbaijani footballers
Azerbaijan Premier League players
Sabah FC (Azerbaijan) players
Footballers from Agdam